The list of traditional Turkish units of measurement, a.k.a. Ottoman units of measurement, is given below.

History 
The Ottoman Empire (1299–1923), the predecessor of modern Turkey was one of the 17 signatories of the Metre Convention in 1875. For 58 years both the international and the traditional units were in use, but after the proclamation of the Turkish Republic, the traditional units became obsolete. In 1931 by Act No. 1782, international units became compulsory and the traditional units were banned from use starting 1 January 1933.

List of units

Length

Area

Volume

Weight

Volumetric flow

Time 
The traditional calendar of the Ottoman Empire was, like in most Muslim countries, the Islamic calendar. Its era begins from the Hijra in 622 CE and each year is calculated using the 12 Arabian lunar months, approximately eleven days shorter than a Gregorian solar year. In 1839, however, a second calendar was put in use for official matters. The new calendar, which was called the Rumi also began by 622, but with an annual duration equal to a solar year after 1840. In modern Turkey, the Gregorian calendar was adopted as the legal calendar, beginning by the end of 1925. But the Islamic calendar is still used when discussing dates in an Islamic context.

See also 
Measurement

Reference and notes

 
Systems of units
Obsolete units of measurement
Turkey-related lists
Economy of the Ottoman Empire
Economic history of Turkey
Ottoman Empire-related lists
Human-based units of measurement
Science and technology in Turkey
Units of measurement by country